= RADIO-MSU Network =

Last Soviet era telecommunications project

RUHEP/Radio-MSU
- Russian High Energy Physics / Radio–Moscow State University
- Founded: 1993
- Founders: SINP MSU
- Type: international scientific computer network
- Key people: Sergey Filippovich Berezhnev
- Website: http://his.radio-msu.net

RUHEP/Radio-MSU is an international scientific computer network established in 1993 on the basis of the D. V. Skobeltsyn Institute of Nuclear Physics, Lomonosov Moscow State University. The network provided Internet access for scientific and educational organizations in Russia and the CIS countries and played a key role in international high-energy physics projects.

== History ==
=== Background ===
In the late 1980s, within the framework of the UNK IHEP project, a high-speed network project was developed with a central node at SINP MSU based on microwave radio relay lines; frequency permits were obtained.

=== Network launch (1992–1993) ===
In 1992, representatives of DFN and DESY discussed with SINP MSU the organization of Internet access for Russian scientists. Under the DESY–SINP MSU agreement, at the end of 1993 a satellite channel Moscow—Hamburg (256 kbit/s) was commissioned, which at that time exceeded the capacity of existing Russian Internet channels.

=== Expansion (1994–1998) ===
In 1994–1995, the capacity of the Moscow—Hamburg channel was increased and new satellite nodes were launched: Novosibirsk, Gatchina, Minsk, Yerevan, Irkutsk, Almaty, Tbilisi, Kharkiv. In 1996–1998, a combined channel (satellite part 1024 kbit/s + terrestrial 128 kbit/s) was implemented with traffic separation by protocol type and packet length.

=== International projects (2000–2010) ===
In 2001–2010, within the framework of the NATO "Science for Peace and Security" program, a unified satellite network Virtual Silk Highway (AS8756) was created for the Caucasus, Central Asia, and Afghanistan, providing national R&D networks with Internet access.

=== Modern stage ===
After 2010, some institutes transferred their main channels to the NRC Kurchatov Institute, retaining backup connections via RUHEP/Radio-MSU. The network continues to operate, providing connections for SINP MSU, MSU departments, and a number of organizations.

== Structure ==
=== International channels ===
RUHEP/Radio-MSU uses connections to RUNNet, RBNet/Gloriad, and GEANT:

- RUNNet — 10 Gbit/s;
- RBNet/Gloriad — channel for CERN and ITER projects;
- GEANT (via RASNet) — 2.4 Gbit/s.

=== Nodes and topology ===
Two main routing centers: AMTS‑9 (MSK‑IX) and SINP MSU (Lenin Hills), connected by fiber optic lines (2 Gbit/s, with planned increase to 10 Gbit/s). Connected are ITEP, MEPhI, FIAN, IHEP, Troitsk SRC RAS, SINP GRID center, MSU Computing Center, and others.

== Technologies ==
Routing: OSPF (internal) and BGP (external); autonomous system — AS2683; BGP community used for announcement management. In the 1990s, a combined satellite-terrestrial channel technology was used.

== Management and funding ==
Supported by the German Ministry of Science (via DFN and DESY), as well as international programs (INTAS, NATO SPS). Operated by NOC Radio‑MSU (24/7).

== Significance ==
In the 1990s, RUHEP/Radio-MSU was the largest international academic network in the CIS and a key channel for Russian research centers to access the global Internet.

== Key people ==
- Sergey F. Berezhnev — project leader.
- N. I. Grishin; G. G. Ermakov; P. V. Filyakin — development and operation.
- Hans Frese (DESY); Adler; Rauschenbach (DFN) — foreign partners.
